New World Guitar Trio was an eclectic, contemporary ensemble founded by David Patterson (guitarist) in 1988. After its inception, the Trio quickly gained notoriety for its highly charged and refined performances which often defied the standard conceptions of the classical guitar repertoire. As the group's musical director and arranger, Patterson earned exceptional praise for his innovative programming and his "ingenious transcriptions of solo piano, chamber, and orchestra works" (Guitar Player magazine). The ensemble had no first, second or third guitarists, but rather, a fluid exchange of leading and supporting roles, tailored to each player's style. This flexibility allowed for individual freedom of expression, resulting in the exceptional dynamism that characterized the Trio's acclaimed performances.

Between 1988 and 1997, the members of the Trio included David Patterson, Thomas Noren, and Dean Harada. Harada left the group and was replaced by Thomas Rohde in the spring of 1997. After 15 years of success, the Trio members disbanded in 2003 to pursue individual projects.

Performances 
The group performed worldwide in diverse venues including: Boston's Jordan Hall, the Isabella Stewart Gardner Museum, the Museum of Fine Arts, Boston, Taipei's National Theater, Rio de Janeiro, Lincoln Center, the Kathryn Bache Miller Theater at Columbia University, Five Spot jazz club, CBGB's gallery, and the 92nd Street Y in New York. The Trio frequently appeared on national radio as part of the NPR series "Performance Today" and "All Things Considered", "Around New York" (WNYC), and the Young Artist Showcase on WQXR.  They also appeared on television and radio throughout Asia and South America.

Commissions and recordings 

In addition to performing original arrangements, the New World Guitar Trio had a history of commissioning new works. In 1996, the group premiered Oceana under the direction of Helmuth Rilling, a commission from Osvaldo Golijov by the Oregon Bach Festival and written for vocalist Lucianna Souza and the Trio.  Other premieres included Dana Brayton's The Preacher (2000), David Leisner’s Roaming (1994), Claudio Ragazzi’s Exiled in Buenos Aires (1997), Fernando Brandão’s Procissão (1999), and Chiel Meijering’s Who’s Hot and Who’s Not, premiered in 1997 with the Boston Modern Orchestra Project.

The ensemble also received high praise for its recordings: "Indeed, what’s remarkable...is how fluidly and fluently the New World Guitar Trio makes this program seem idiomatic to three guitars, while providing a refreshing new perspective on the music itself" (Audio Magazine on the Trio's debut release in 1995). Their 2000 CD release, Exiled, also offers a unique collection of works, with the Trio's arrangements of works by Charles Ives, George Gershwin, and Carlos Paredes as well as commissions from Brandão, Leisner, and Ragazzi.

Discography 
New World Guitar Trio (9 93TMR-6)
Exiled (2 00NW2-2)

American classical music groups